Vietnam-Australia School, Hanoi (VAS Hanoi) is a semi-international school established in pursuant to decision No 1452/QD-UBND dated 13 April 2007 of the People’s Committee of Hanoi.

VAS Hanoi follows the Vietnamese Curriculum in preschool, primary, secondary and high school. All sections of the school are located together on the one campus, in My Dinh 1 residential area.

With 12 years of development, VAS Hanoi is one of the leading semi-international schools in Vietnam with nearly 1200 students.

In 2013, VAS Hanoi was one of the first two schools in Hanoi to be recognized as Cambridge International School registered number VN235 by Cambridge Assessment International Education. The school has been qualified to teach three international Cambridge programs: Cambridge Primary, Cambridge Lower Secondary and Cambridge Upper Secondary – IGCSE.

In 2019, VAS Hanoi becomes the first school in Vietnam to be accredited as "Cambridge Assessment English Partnership School" by Cambridge Assessment English.

To be accredited, VAS Hanoi underwent a strict process of evaluation of its teachers, curriculum and facilities.

Experienced native English teachers from a variety of English-speaking nations are selected by Australian strategic partner Presbyterian Ladies' College, Sydney – PLC Sydney school, trained annually both at home and abroad, and committed to long-term,  full-time employment at VAS Hanoi.

At VAS Hanoi, the goal is to prepare students well so that they can manage the diverse challenges of the 21st century. In a future which will be governed more and more by technology, people who are adaptable, have good emotional intelligence and who are able to collaborate well across international boundaries will have a definite advantage. It is clear that Vietnamese students of the future will need to be confident, be able to communicate clearly in order to work in an expanding global environment.

Education model

Vietnamese curriculum (MOET)
VAS Hanoi follows the Vietnamese curriculum in preschool, primary, secondary and high school.

Cambridge curriculum 
VAS Hanoi was one of the first two schools in Hanoi to be recognized as a Cambridge International School, registered number VN235 in 2013. To be accredited, VAS Hanoi underwent a strict process of evaluation of its teachers, curriculum and facilities. The school has been qualified to teach three international Cambridge programs:
 Cambridge Primary
Cambridge Lower Secondary  
Cambridge Upper Secondary - IGCSE

At VAS Hanoi Preschool, children study with native-speaking teachers from 15–17 periods per week.

Co-curriculum
 After school, students participate in sports, arts, social activities, economy and language. These clubs are managed by Vietnamese and foreign teachers and some invited coaches. 
 Sporting competitions, language nights, art exhibitions and performances are organized within the school.
 Each year, VAS Hanoi hosts visits of students from Australian schools. The school also sends groups of students to Australia and creates opportunities for its students to work with charity projects, sporting and music events.
 Communication in English is encouraged within the school campus.

International teachers 
The team of international teachers at VAS Hanoi is led by an International Vice Principal. The teachers are all native English speakers from a range of English-speaking nations. This allows those students to gain wide experience in understanding different accents and cultural nuances and expands their world views. Teachers are offered opportunities to develop themselves professionally and there is an emphasis on working together as a team.

Facilities and equipment 
There are also two large classrooms with 200 seats per room.

The school's classrooms are equipped with air conditioning and advanced teaching and learning facilities such as Internet-connected computers, video projectors, projectors, pin boards and audio-visual equipment. Classrooms also feature an interactive board. Computer networks, computer labs, libraries, music rooms, study rooms, health clinics are well-equipped.

Partner school
PLC Sydney is an Australian private school established in the late 1880s on the UK model. In recent years, they both have continuously been in the top group in the New South Wales HSC School ranking.

References

Educational institutions established in 2007
Schools in Hanoi
Australia–Vietnam relations
2007 establishments in Vietnam